Gilbert Kearly Patrick (22 January 1908 – 6 August 1995) was an Australian rules footballer who played with Footscray in the Victorian Football League (VFL).

Patrick was recruited from the Wangaratta Rovers.

Patrick later served in the Royal Australian Air Force during World War II.

Notes

External links 

1908 births
1995 deaths
Australian rules footballers from Victoria (Australia)
Western Bulldogs players